Merivale is a suburb of Christchurch, New Zealand, north of the city centre. Like all suburbs in Christchurch, it has no defined boundaries and is a general area, but for the purposes of statistical analysis only, Statistics New Zealand defines it as being Heaton Street to the north, Papanui Road to the east, Harper and Bealey Avenues to the south and Rossall Street to the west, although Real Estate advertising often will claim residences outside this area, especially St Albans to the east of Papanui Road, as being Merivale due to the perceived desirability of the area. The area directly west of Rossall Street, which is called Holmwood by Statistics New Zealand, is sometimes considered part of Merivale.

The area is predominantly residential.

Early history
Charlotte Jackson of Rugby arrived in 1851 for her two rural sections which went from Merivale Lane to Aikmans Road and from Papanui Road to Boundary Road. She named the  block Merevale. Her brother-in-law, the Rev. Thomas Jackson, was the vicar of Merevale, near Atherstone in Warwickshire. Charlotte Jackson later sold the sections. In December 1859 she sold the northern  to Capt. T. H. Withers of Deptford, and in 1862 the southern  to William Sefton Moorhouse. Moorhouse built a magnificent home on Merevale farm at 31 Naseby Street, which was demolished after the Christchurch earthquakes of 2010/2011. Subsequent owners of the property included John Studholme, John Thomas Peacock and Alfred Louisson.

A hotel has stood at the intersection of Papanui Road and Bealey Avenue since 1865. Carlton Hotel was built in its place in 1906 in time for the New Zealand International Exhibition. The hotel was demolished in April 2011 and has since been rebuilt to a contemporary design.

There are still a few of the narrow streets and lanes and many of the original cottages have been restored.

Demographics

Merivale had a population of 5,034 at the 2018 New Zealand census, an increase of 18 people (0.4%) since the 2013 census, and a decrease of 519 people (−9.3%) since the 2006 census. There were 2,076 households. There were 2,274 males and 2,757 females, giving a sex ratio of 0.82 males per female, with 786 people (15.6%) aged under 15 years, 981 (19.5%) aged 15 to 29, 2,292 (45.5%) aged 30 to 64, and 966 (19.2%) aged 65 or older.

Ethnicities were 86.8% European/Pākehā, 4.7% Māori, 1.3% Pacific peoples, 10.3% Asian, and 2.6% other ethnicities (totals add to more than 100% since people could identify with multiple ethnicities).

The proportion of people born overseas was 25.8%, compared with 27.1% nationally.

Although some people objected to giving their religion, 46.6% had no religion, 43.4% were Christian, 0.8% were Hindu, 0.6% were Muslim, 0.7% were Buddhist and 2.6% had other religions.

Of those at least 15 years old, 1,749 (41.2%) people had a bachelor or higher degree, and 288 (6.8%) people had no formal qualifications. The employment status of those at least 15 was that 2,085 (49.1%) people were employed full-time, 753 (17.7%) were part-time, and 108 (2.5%) were unemployed.

Economy

Merivale Mall

Merivale Mall, the local shopping centre, covers 7,580 m². It has 55 retailers including FreshChoice.

Education

Elmwood Normal School is a coeducational contributing primary school catering for years 1 to 6. The school opened in 1882.

St Margaret's College is a private Anglican girls' school for years 1 to 13. The school opened in 1910.

Rangi Ruru Girls' School is a private Presbyterian girls' school for years 7 to 13. The school opened in 1889.

Selwyn House School is a private full primary girls' school for years 1 to 8. It opened in 1929, with the forerunner Miss Sanders' School founded in 1875.

Rolls are as of

References

Suburbs of Christchurch